The Las Vegas Senior Classic was a golf tournament on the Champions Tour from 1986–2001. It was played in Las Vegas, Nevada at the Desert Inn Country Club (1986–1993) and at the TPC at The Canyons, now known as TPC Las Vegas, from 1994–2001.

The purse for the 2001 tournament was US$1,400,000, with $210,000 going to the winner.

Winners
Las Vegas Senior Classic
2001 Bruce Fleisher

Las Vegas Senior Classic presented by TruGreen-Chemlawn
2000 Larry Nelson
1999 Vicente Fernández
1998 Hale Irwin
1997 Hale Irwin

Las Vegas Senior Classic
1996 Jim Colbert
1995 Jim Colbert
1994 Raymond Floyd
1993 Gibby Gilbert
1992 Lee Trevino
1991 Chi-Chi Rodríguez
1990 Chi-Chi Rodríguez

General Tires Las Vegas Classic
1989 Charles Coody
1988 Larry Mowry

Las Vegas Senior Classic
1987 Al Geiberger
1986 Bruce Crampton

Source:

References

Former PGA Tour Champions events
Golf in Las Vegas
Recurring sporting events established in 1986
Recurring sporting events disestablished in 2001
1986 establishments in Nevada
2001 disestablishments in Nevada